The Fleer Corporation, founded by Frank H. Fleer in 1885, was the first company to successfully manufacture bubble gum; it remained a family-owned enterprise until 1989.

Fleer originally developed a bubble gum formulation called Blibber-Blubber in 1906. While this gum could be blown into bubbles, in other respects it was vastly inferior to regular chewing gum, and Blibber-Blubber was never marketed to the public. In 1928, Fleer employee Walter Diemer improved the Blibber-Blubber formulation to produce the first commercially successful bubble gum, Dubble Bubble. Its pink color set a tradition for nearly all bubble gums to follow. 

Fleer became known as a maker of sports cards, starting in 1923 with the production of baseball cards. Fleer also released American football (1960) and basketball (1986) card sets through its history.

The company also produced some non-sports trading cards. In 1995, Fleer acquired the trading card company SkyBox International and, over Thanksgiving vacation shuttered its Philadelphia plant (where Dubble Bubble had been made for 67 years). In 1998, 70-year-old Dubble Bubble was acquired by Canadian company Concord Confections; Concord, in turn, was acquired by Chicago-based Tootsie Roll Industries in 2004.

In late May 2005, news circulated that Fleer was suspending its trading card operations immediately. By early July, in a move similar to declaring bankruptcy, the company began to liquidate its assets to repay creditors. The move included the auction of the Fleer trade name, as well as other holdings.  Competitor Upper Deck won the Fleer name, as well as their die cast toy business, at a price of $6.1 million. Just one year earlier, Upper Deck tendered an offer of $25 million, which was rejected by Fleer based on the hope that the sports card market would turn in a direction more favorable to their licenses and target collector demographic.  One negative aspect associated with Fleer's Assignment for the Benefit of Creditors is that many sports card collectors now own redemption cards for autographs and memorabilia that may not be able to be redeemed; those fears were somewhat quenched in early 2006 when random memorabilia cards were mailed to the aforementioned collectors.

Beginning and early card attempts

The Fleer company was started by Frank H. Fleer in Philadelphia, 1885, as a confectionery business. Well established as a gum and candy company, Fleer predated many of its competitors into the business of issuing sports cards with its 1923 release of baseball cards in its "Bobs and Fruit Hearts" candy product. These rare cards are basically the same as the 1923 W515 strip cards but are machine cut and have a printed ad for the candy company on the back. Many years later in 1959 it signed baseball star Ted Williams to a contract and sold an 80-card set oriented around highlights of his career. Fleer was unable to include other players because rival company Topps had signed most active baseball players to exclusive contracts.

Williams was nearing the end of his career and retired after the 1960 season. Fleer continued to produce baseball cards by featuring Williams with other mostly retired players in a Baseball Greats series. One set was produced in 1960 and a second in 1961. The company did not produce new cards the next year, but continued selling the 1961 set while it focused on signing enough players to produce a set featuring active players in 1963. This 67-card set included a number of stars, including 1962 National League MVP Maury Wills (then holder of the modern record for stolen bases in a season), who had elected to sign with Fleer instead of Topps. Wills and Jimmy Piersall served as player representatives for Fleer, helping to bring others on board. Topps still held the rights to most players and the set was not particularly successful.

Meanwhile, Fleer took advantage of the emergence of the American Football League (AFL) in 1960 to begin producing football cards. Fleer produced a set for the AFL while Topps cards covered the established National Football League. In 1961, each company produced cards featuring players from both leagues. The next year reverted to the status quo ante, with Fleer covering the AFL and Topps the NFL. In 1964, Philadelphia Gum secured the rights for NFL cards and Topps took over the AFL.

Sometime after 1961 Fleer produced The Three Stooges' cards.

Legal battles

This left Fleer with no product in either baseball or football. The company now turned its efforts to supporting an administrative complaint filed against Topps by the Federal Trade Commission. The complaint focused on the baseball card market, alleging that Topps was engaging in unfair competition through its aggregation of exclusive contracts. A hearing examiner ruled against Topps in 1965, but the Commission reversed this decision on appeal. The Commission concluded that because the contracts only covered the sale of cards with gum, competition was still possible by selling cards with other small, low-cost products. Fleer chose not to pursue such options and instead sold its remaining player contracts to Topps for $395,000 in 1966($3,344,211.42 in 2021 dollars). The decision gave Topps an effective monopoly of the baseball card market.

In 1968, Fleer was approached by the Major League Baseball Players Association, a recently organized players' union, about obtaining a group license to produce cards. The MLBPA was in a dispute with Topps over player contracts, and offered Fleer the exclusive rights to market cards of most players starting in 1973, when many of Topps's contracts would expire. Since this was so far in the future, Fleer declined the proposal.

Fleer returned to the union in September 1974 with a proposal to sell 5-by-7-inch satin patches of players, somewhat larger than normal baseball cards. By now, the MLBPA had settled its differences with Topps and reached an agreement that gave Topps a right of first refusal on such offers. Topps passed on the opportunity, indicating that it did not think the product would be successful. The union, also fearing that it would cut into existing royalties from Topps sales, then rejected the proposal.

In April 1975, Fleer asked for Topps to waive its exclusive rights and allow Fleer to produce stickers, stamps, or other small items featuring active baseball players. Topps refused, and Fleer then sued both Topps and the MLBPA to break the Topps monopoly. After several years of litigation, the Topps monopoly on baseball cards was finally broken by a lawsuit decided by federal judge Clarence Charles Newcomer in 1980, in which the judge ended Topps's exclusive right to sell baseball cards with gum, allowing Fleer to compete in the market. The court ordered the union to offer group licenses for baseball cards to companies other than Topps. Fleer and another company, Donruss, were thus allowed to begin making cards in 1981. Fleer's legal victory was overturned after one season, but the company continued to manufacture cards, substituting stickers with team logos for gum.

Bill Ripken
In 1989, Bill Ripken's Fleer card showed him holding a bat with the expletive "fuck face" written in plain view on the knob of the bat. Fleer subsequently rushed to correct the error, and in its haste, released versions in which the text was scrawled over with a marker, whited out with correction fluid, and also airbrushed. On the final, corrected version, Fleer obscured the offensive words with a black box (this was the version included in all factory sets). Both the original card and many of the corrected versions have become collector's items as a result. There are at least ten different variations of this card. As of February 2009 the white out version has a book value of $120, but has been sold in mint condition on eBay for asking prices as high as $400. Years later, Ripken admitted he wrote the expletive on the bat to distinguish it as a batting practice bat, and did not intend to use it for the card.

Some collectors list the card as the "Rick Face" card. The script on the bat appears to make the word fuck look similar to Rick.

Key card sets
Fleer produced two benchmark trading cards in the 1980s. In 1984, Fleer was the only major trading card manufacturer to release a Roger Clemens card; they included the then-Boston Red Sox prospect in their 1984 Fleer Baseball Update Set. The 1984 update set also included the first licensed card of Hall Of Fame outfielder Kirby Puckett. Fleer also released factory sets of their baseball cards from 1986-92.  Like the Topps factory sets, they came in colorful boxes for retail and plainer boxes for hobby dealers.  The 1986 set was not sealed, but the 1987-89 sets were sealed with a sticker and the 1990-92 sets were shrink-wrapped.

In 1986 Fleer helped resurrect the basketball card industry by releasing the 1986-87 Fleer Basketball set which included the rookie cards of Michael Jordan and Charles Barkley.  This set is seen by many basketball card collectors as the "1952 Topps of basketball."

In the late 1990s and early 2000s, the glossy parallel sets Fleer produced for their 1987-89 baseball sets (similar to the Topps Tiffany sets) became very popular in the hobby. That popularity wore off, and today, the sets (except for the rare 1989) are not worth much more than the regular sets.

Fleer's first Ultra set came out in 1991, which in some years was released earlier than its regular Fleer (Tradition) set.  The 1991 set had an announced production of 15% of regular Fleer and this set was produced on higher quality card stock and used silver ink, just like Donruss' Leaf set starting the previous year. The 1992 set used UV coating on both sides and gold foil stamping on the front, which was among the most beautiful sets of that year. 1994's Ultra and regular Fleer sets began another tradition of offering an insert card in every pack and the next year started another tradition called "hot packs" (where about 1:72 packs contained only insert cards. An assortment of the easier to find insert cards and not the rare 1:36 100% foil cards). Still another tradition that continues today is the Ultra Gold Medallion parallel insert set, which started in 1995 and also included all the insert sets for the first two years. These are inserted one per pack. In 1997, Ultra introduced the Platinum Medallion insert set which is traditionally serial numbered to 100. 1998 saw the introduction of the purple Ultra Masterpieces, which are one of ones, and started the tradition of including short printed cards in the regular, Gold and Platinum sets.

Fleer's super premium flagship set, called Flair, began production in 1993 with an announced production run as 15% of Ultra. Its trademark was that it was printed on very thick card stock (about twice the thickness of regular cards), used a unique glossy finish along with six color printing.  The "packs" are done by shrink wrapping the cards (usually ten in a "pack") and then placing them in a shrink-wrapped "mini-box" instead of the usual my-lair foil packs used on virtually all trading card products today. The 1996/1997 Flair Showcase basketball box set included the first one-of-one cards for any major sport called "Masterpieces"; they paralleled the more common, or "base", Row 2, Row 1 and Row 0 sets.

Fleer acquired a license deal from WWE to produce and distribute WWE trading cards from 2001 to 2004.

Acquisitions
The Fleer family, Frank Fleer's descendants, sold Fleer in 1989 for just under US$70,000,000 to John W. Fleer and Charter House Investments. John W. Fleer retained majority ownership in the company. Fleer was pushing into retail chains like Rite Aid, which brought the ire of the hobby dealers in the early 1990s.

Comic book company Marvel Entertainment purchased the company on July 24, 1992, for US$540 million. Marvel purchased another card company, SkyBox International, on March 8, 1995, for $150 million. Fleer/Skybox reduced its push into retail chains to start its Hobby Bullpen program that committed the company to support and provide relief for hobby dealers and collectors.

Marvel entered bankruptcy in 1996 along with its subsidiaries. Fleer was directly hurt by the 1994 Major League Baseball strike and prolonged lockouts in the NBA. In June 1997, Marvel formed its Marvel Enterprise division, headed by president and CEO Scott C. Marden, to manage its trading card and sticker businesses, as well as Marvel Interactive, an Internet-entertainment and software-publishing company.

Fleer was placed on the market by Marvel at an asking price of $30 million. Fleer exited bankruptcy, along with the rest of the Marvel group, on October 1, 1998. In February 1999, Fleer/Skybox was sold to a corporation owned by Alex Grass and his son Roger.

In early 2005, Fleer announced that it would cease all productions of trading cards and file an Assignment for the Benefit of Creditors, which is a State Court liquidation, similar to Chapter 7 bankruptcy. In July 2005, Upper Deck acquired the rights to the Fleer name and began producing Fleer-branded basketball, ice hockey and American football cards. The $6.1 million Upper Deck paid for the Fleer name was significantly less than the $25 million they had offered to buy out Fleer a year earlier.

In 2006, Upper Deck produced baseball sets under the names Fleer, Fleer Ultra, Fleer Tradition, Flair, Skybox Autographics and Fleer Greats of the Game. The last Fleer-branded baseball cards appeared in 2007.

References

External links
 

Chewing gum
Food manufacturers of the United States
Trading card companies
Manufacturing companies based in Philadelphia
Culture of Philadelphia
Food and drink companies established in 1885
Companies disestablished in 2005